Greenville Valley is the large mainly ice-free valley lying south of Elkhorn Ridge in the Convoy Range of Victoria Land, Antarctica. A lobe of the Northwind Glacier flows a short distance west into the mouth of the valley. Near the head of the valley the south wall is breached by the entrance to Merrell Valley. It was explored in 1957 by the New Zealand Northern Survey Party of the Commonwealth Trans-Antarctic Expedition, 1956–58, and was named by them after the USNS Greenville Victory, a freighter in the main American convoy into McMurdo Sound in the 1956–57 season.

References

Valleys of Victoria Land
Scott Coast